Jukka Sipilä (12 May 1936, Kivijärvi – 7 August 2004, Helsinki, Finland) was a prolific Finnish actor and television director.

He began acting in film in the 1960s and took up TV directing shortly in the early 1970s before concentrating on acting again. He appeared in films such as the 1983 James Bond spoof Agent 000 and the Deadly Curves opposite actors Ilmari Saarelainen and Tenho Sauren. He retired in 2003 shortly before his death.

Selected filmography
 Käpy selän alla, 1966
 Lapualaismorsian, 1967
 Täällä Pohjantähden alla, 1968
 Leikkikalugangsteri, 1969
 Sixtynine 69, 1969
 Naisenkuvia, 1970
 Lampaansyöjät, 1972
 Hellyys, 1972
 Pohjantähti, 1973
 Mies. joka ei osannut sanoa ei, 1975
 Ihmemies, 1979
 Kiljusten herrasväki, 1981
 Hukkaputki TV-comedy show (1981–1983)
 Agentti 000 ja kuoleman kurvit, 1983
 Uuno Turhapuro muuttaa maalle, 1986
 Vääpeli Körmy ja vetenalaiset vehkeet, 1991
 Lipton Cockton in the Shadows of Sodoma, 1995
 Pahat pojat, 2002

External links

Finnish male actors
Finnish television directors
1936 births
2004 deaths